Bon Repos sur Blavet (literally Bon Repos on Blavet) is a commune in the department of Côtes-d'Armor, western France. The municipality was established on 1 January 2017 by merger of the former communes of Laniscat (the seat), Perret and Saint-Gelven.

See also 
Communes of the Côtes-d'Armor department

References 

Communes of Côtes-d'Armor

Communes nouvelles of Côtes-d'Armor
Populated places established in 2017
2017 establishments in France